Felipe de Sovih Adão (born 2 April 1990) is a Brazilian footballer who plays as a defender.

Career
Felipe Chalegre started his career with Campo Grande. In 2006, he left for Italian Serie B club Vicenza along with teammate Diego Tolentino and Renan Wagner, which they shared the same agent: Pedrinho VRP.

During the 2009–10 season, he was call-up to pre-season camp of the first team and awarded the number 25 shirt.

In January 2010, he graduated from the youth team, loaned to Colligiana of Lega Pro Seconda Divisione.

He returned to Vicenza in 2010–11 Serie B but did not play any game.

References

External links
 Football.it Profile 
 
 Lega Serie B Profile 

Brazilian footballers
Brazilian expatriate footballers
Campo Grande Atlético Clube players
L.R. Vicenza players
A.S.D. Olimpia Colligiana players
Association football central defenders
Expatriate footballers in Italy
Brazilian expatriate sportspeople in Italy
1990 births
Living people